Belayneh Densamo (born 28 June 1965) is an Ethiopian former long-distance runner, and a long-period world record holder for the marathon discipline. He held the world record for 10 years (1988-1998).

Early life
Belayneh was born in Diramo Afarrara in Sidamo, the southernmost province, and began first competing professionally at national level.

Career
Densamo broke the world record by 22 seconds with a time of 2:06:50 at the 1988 Rotterdam Marathon, following three previous wins at major marathons 1986–1987. This record lasted the third-longest span ever recorded (and since the event was first professionally organized at the 1896 Olympics).

Last victories
Densamo won two major international marathons in 1989 and in 1990.  He was not among the three Ethiopian men who entered the marathon in the 1992 Summer Olympics. He represented Ethiopia at the marathon at the 1996 Summer Olympics, as the world record holder in the relatively humid summer Atlanta, Georgia conditions and was among 13 of a field of 130 who did not finish.  Densamo's world record fell to Ronaldo da Costa at the Berlin Marathon in 1998.

As of 2009, Belayneh lives in the area of Cambridge, Massachusetts and has retired from international competition.

Achievements
All results regarding marathon, unless stated otherwise

References

External links
Runners World
Running World Wall of Fame

1965 births
Living people
Ethiopian male long-distance runners
Ethiopian male marathon runners
Olympic athletes of Ethiopia
Athletes (track and field) at the 1996 Summer Olympics
World record setters in athletics (track and field)
African Games gold medalists for Ethiopia
African Games medalists in athletics (track and field)
Goodwill Games medalists in athletics
Athletes (track and field) at the 1987 All-Africa Games
Competitors at the 1986 Goodwill Games
Olympic male marathon runners
20th-century Ethiopian people